Jackson Township is one of the fourteen townships of Shelby County, Ohio, United States.  The 2000 census found 2,346 people in the township, 977 of whom lived in the unincorporated portions of the township.

Geography
Located in the northeastern corner of the county, it borders the following townships:
Clay Township, Auglaize County - north
Stokes Township, Logan County - northeast
Bloomfield Township, Logan County - southeast
Salem Township - south
Franklin Township - southwest
Dinsmore Township - west
Pusheta Township, Auglaize County - northwest corner

The village of Jackson Center is located in central Jackson Township, and the unincorporated community of Montra lies in the township's southwest.

Name and history
Jackson Township was established in 1833. It is one of thirty-seven Jackson Townships statewide.

Government
The township is governed by a three-member board of trustees, who are elected in November of odd-numbered years to a four-year term beginning on the following January 1. Two are elected in the year after the presidential election and one is elected in the year before it. There is also an elected township fiscal officer, who serves a four-year term beginning on April 1 of the year after the election, which is held in November of the year before the presidential election. Vacancies in the fiscal officership or on the board of trustees are filled by the remaining trustees.

References

External links
County website

Townships in Shelby County, Ohio
Townships in Ohio